Stochastic Petri nets are a form of Petri net where the transitions fire after a probabilistic delay determined by a random variable.

Definition
A stochastic Petri net is a five-tuple SPN = (P, T, F, M0, Λ) where:
 P is a set of states, called places.
 T is a set of transitions.
 F where F ⊂ (P × T) ∪ (T × P) is a set of flow relations called "arcs" between places and transitions (and between transitions and places).
 M0 is the initial marking.
 Λ =  is the array of firing rates λ associated with the transitions. The firing rate, a random variable, can also be a function λ(M) of the current marking.

Correspondence to Markov process
The reachability graph of stochastic Petri nets can be mapped directly to a Markov process. It satisfies the Markov property, since its states depend only on the current marking. 
Each state in the reachability graph is mapped to a state in the Markov process, and the firing of a transition with firing rate λ corresponds to a Markov state transition with probability λ.

Software tools

 Platform Independent Petri net Editor
 ORIS Tool
 GreatSPN

References

External links
Stochastic Petri Nets: an Introduction
Stochastic Petri Nets

Petri nets
Formal specification languages
Models of computation
Concurrency (computer science)